Muhammad Syafwan bin Syahlan (born 15 January 1993) is a Malaysian footballer who plays as a winger for Kuala Lumpur.

References

External links
 

1993 births
Living people
Malaysian footballers
Kuala Lumpur City F.C. players
Malaysia Super League players
Association football forwards